Melaleuca subulata is a plant in the myrtle family Myrtaceae, and is endemic to south eastern Australia. (Some Australian state herbaria continue to use the name Callistemon subulatus). It is a small, spreading shrub with hard bark, dense foliage, cylindrical leaves and spikes of dark crimson flowers in summer.

Description

The flowers are a deep crimson colour and are arranged in spikes at the end of, or around the branches which continue to grow after flowering.

Taxonomy and naming
Melaleuca subulata was first named in 2006 by Lyndley Craven in Novon when Callistemon subulatus was transferred to the present genus. Callistemon subulatus was first formally described by botanist Edwin Cheel in 1925 in Proceedings of the Linnean Society of New South Wales Series. The specific epithet (subulata) refers to the subulate shape of the leaves.

Callistemon subulatus is regarded as a synonym of Melaleuca subulata by the Royal Botanic Gardens, Kew.

Distribution and habitat
This melaleuca occurs in and between the Heathcote and Mittagong districts in New South Wales and East Gippsland in Victoria. It grows in creek beds and on the banks of streams in forests.

Use in horticulture
Melaleuca subulata is commonly cultivated because of it abundant, attractive flowers. It is hardy but benefits from the application of low-phosphorus fertiliser.

References

subulata
Flora of New South Wales
Flora of Victoria (Australia)
Plants described in 1925
Taxa named by Edwin Cheel